Maciej Kostrzewa is a Polish footballer who plays as a midfielder.

References

External links
 
 

1991 births
Living people
Polish footballers
Association football midfielders
Lechia Gdańsk players
Wisła Płock players
Chojniczanka Chojnice players
Ekstraklasa players
Sportspeople from Gdańsk